Frank McPhillips is a former Gaelic footballer who played at senior level for the Dublin county team.

Playing career
McPhillips was a goalkeeper and was a member of the Dublin panel which won the All-Ireland Senior Football Championship in 1963. He collected 2 Leinster Senior Football Championship medals in 1962, '63 and he also won an All-Ireland Junior Football Championship medal in 1960.

References

Year of birth missing (living people)
Living people
Dublin inter-county Gaelic footballers
Gaelic football goalkeepers
Garda Síochána officers
Sportspeople from Dublin (city)